The Boobyalla Islands are two small islands  northeast of Kirkby Head, Enderby Land. They were plotted from air photos taken from Australian National Antarctic Research Expeditions aircraft in 1956, and named by the Antarctic Names Committee of Australia after the Australian native willow, "Boobyalla" (Acacia longifolia).

See also 
 List of Antarctic and sub-Antarctic islands

References 

Islands of Enderby Land